Sivakkajoki may refer to:

Sivakkajoki, Finland, location of Kivimaa mine
Sivakkajoki (river), a river in Sweden